Jean Adair (born Violet McNaughton; June 13, 1873 – May 11, 1953) was a Canadian actress. She was also known as Jennet Adair.

Career
Born Violet McNaughton in Hamilton, Ontario, Her work as Jennet Adair in vaudeville included performing as a "singing comedienne".

Adair received a scholarship for a dramatic school course, after which she acted for two years with stock theater companies. She moved from stock performances to replacing Irene Dunne in a production of Mother, and her New York debut came in September 1922 when she acted in It's a Boy at the Sam H. Harris Theatre. 

She worked primarily on stage but also made several film appearances late in her career, most notably as Aunt Martha, one of Cary Grant's dotty old aunts in Arsenic and Old Lace, a role she originated on Broadway.  Her final performance was as the  beloved matriarch Rebecca Nurse  in the original production of The Crucible.  Like many stage actresses of her era, she also appeared in vaudeville.

Death 
She died at Beth Israel Hospital in New York City on 11 May 1953, aged 79. She was cremated at Ferncliff Crematory in Hartsdale, New York. Her ashes were collected by playwright Howard Lindsay.

Broadway productions

 It's a Boy! (1922-?)
 The Jay Walker (1926)
 Devils (1926)
 The Good Fellow (1926)
 Machinal (1928)  (*with a young unknown Clark Gable)
 That Ferguson Family (1928-9)
 Scarlet Pages (1929)
 Everything's Jake (1930)
 Rock Me, Julie (1931)
 Blessed Event (1932)
 Best Years (1932)
 Black Sheep (1932)
 The Show Off (1932-3)
 For Services Rendered (1933)
 Murder at the Vanities (1933-4)
 Broomsticks, Amen! (1934)
 Picnic (1934-?)
 Mid-West (1936-?)
 Sun Kissed (1937-?)
 On Borrowed Time (1938)
 Morning's at Seven (1939–40)
 Goodbye in the Night (1940)
 Arsenic and Old Lace (1941-4)
 Star-Spangled Family (1945)
 The Next Half Hour (1945)
 Detective Story (1949–50)
 Bell, Book and Candle (1950-1)
 The Crucible (1953)

Filmography

References

External links

Jean Adair, held by the Billy Rose Theatre Division, New York Public Library for the Performing Arts
  Jean Adair papers 1914-1936 (bulk 1914-1929) , held by the Billy Rose Theatre Division, New York Public Library for the Performing Arts

1873 births
1953 deaths
Canadian film actresses
Canadian stage actresses
Vaudeville performers
Actresses from Hamilton, Ontario
20th-century Canadian actresses
Canadian expatriate actresses in the United States